Cawkwell is a surname. Notable people with the surname include:

 George Cawkwell (1919–2019), New Zealand-British ancient historian
 Simon Cawkwell (born 1946), British businessman, stock market commentator, and author

See also
 Cawkwell, a hamlet in Lincolnshire, England